Samaantar (Parallel) is a 2009 Marathi film directed by Amol Palekar and starring Palekar himself along with Sharmila Tagore in the lead roles. This is Sharmila's first Marathi film. Director Amol Palekar's previous film in the dual role of actor-director was Ankahee (1985).

Plot
Keshav Vaze (Amol Palekar) is an eminent businessman based in Pune who started his life struggle from a small village and is now the owner of his industrial empire. He was left to take care of several younger family members after a massive earthquake caused the death of his parents and brothers. Keshav even took in an orphaned girl Reva (Radhika Apte) and raised her as his own daughter. His business kept on growing larger and larger making his day stacked with board meetings, conventions, tours, etc. Keshav has become a dear public figure surrounded by many people, including his two psychiatric colleagues Dr. Paritosh (Sameer Dharmadhikari) and Dr. Nikumbh (Kishore Kadam). 

However, each day ends in the cluttered darkness of his own melancholy, as Keshav has hidden his mysterious grief from his past within himself for years. On his 60th birthday, Keshav decides to find serenity for himself and takes a major decision of contemplating suicide due to the boredom in his life. He expresses his desire of ending his life to his family members who all are left stunned at this. In hopes of making him change his decision regarding his life, Reva has Keshav accompany her for a trip to Kolkata on Paritosh and Nikumbh's acquaintance. 

Upon arriving, a slice of Keshav's frozen past accidentally gets scratched. Keshav unexpectedly gets a glimpse of Shama (Sharmila Tagore), who was once the anchor of his existence. Her mesmerizing beauty, poise and silence and her immortal violin notes heard by Keshav suddenly personify his vacuum of the last 30 years. It is revealed that Shama was Keshav's soulmate in college, and that she vanished from his life forever after Keshav left for his village due to the earthquake. 

Keshav is even more shocked to learn that Shama is the mother of Paritosh and realises that he is his biological father. Oblivious since her shocking yesteryear, he strives to learn more about Shama who hardly speaks anything for having went into a state of mental shock since Keshav's disappearance during her pregnancy. She had chosen to be a recluse, hidden from the sunrise. Keshav realises the mockery of their fate as they both had drifted apart walking their different and parallel ways, sharing their loneliness. 

Why did Keshav had Shama choose to live the way they did? What was the motivation behind their present? Do they find their lost love again? Samaantar reveals the lost traces of parallel folds.

Cast
 Amol Palekar as Keshav Vaze
 Sharmila Tagore as Shama Vaze
 Radhika Apte as Reva (Keshav's adopted daughter) 
 Sameer Dharmadhikari as Dr. Paritosh (Keshav's biological son)
 Kishore Kadam as Dr. Nikumbh (Paritosh's colleague)
 Aishwarya Narkar as Keshav's niece 
 Makarand Deshpande as Makarand (estranged husband of Keshav's niece) 
 Haider Ali as Dilip Saxena (Keshav's former college mate)
 Vandana Gupte as Jyotsna Saxena (Dilip's wife and Keshav's former college mate)

Music
"Kai Jahale Tula Mana Re" - Shreya Ghoshal, Shankar Mahadevan
"Navika Re Hati Tuzya" - Sudesh Bhosale
"Nuste Nuste Dole Bhartana" (duet) - Shreya Ghoshal, Shankar Mahadevan
"Nuste Nuste Dole Bhartana" (female) - Shreya Ghoshal
"Nuste Nuste Dole Bhartana" (male) - Shankar Mahadevan

References

External links

2000s Marathi-language films
2009 films
Films directed by Amol Palekar
Films scored by Anand Modak